This is a list of years in Ireland. See also the timeline of Irish history.  For only articles about years in Ireland that have been written, see :Category:Years in Ireland.

Twenty-first century

Twentieth century

Nineteenth century

Eighteenth century

Seventeenth century

Sixteenth century

Fifteenth century

Fourteenth century

Thirteenth century

Twelfth century

Eleventh century 
11th century in Ireland

First millennium AD 
10th century in Ireland
9th century in Ireland
8th century in Ireland
7th century in Ireland
6th century in Ireland
5th century in Ireland
4th century in Ireland
3rd century in Ireland
2nd century in Ireland
First century in Ireland

First millennium BC 
 First millennium B.C. in Ireland

See also
List of years in Northern Ireland
:Category:Year lists by country

Ireland history-related lists
 
Republic of Ireland-related lists
 
History of the Republic of Ireland
Ireland